Lee Jae-ik (Hangul: 이재익) (born March 18, 1994, in Ansan, Gyeonggi) is a South Korean pitcher for the Samsung Lions in the Korea Baseball Organization (KBO).

References 

Samsung Lions players
KBO League pitchers
South Korean baseball players
1994 births
Living people
People from Ansan
Sportspeople from Gyeonggi Province